Lajos Somodi is the name of:

 Lajos Somodi, Sr. (1928–2012), Hungarian fencer who competed at the 1956 Summer Olympics
 Lajos Somodi, Jr. (born 1953), Hungarian fencer who competed at the 1976 Summer Olympics